Ali Shah
Ali Shah (Kashmir) was the sultan of Kashmir in 1585. He was removed from office in this year by the forces of Akbar. His son Yaqub continued an active resistance until June 1589.

Sources

John F. Richards. New Cambridge History of India: The Mughal Empire'. New York: Cambridge University Press, 1993. p. 51.

Year of birth missing
Year of death missing
Sultans of Kashmir